Everhardt Franßen  (born October 1, 1937 in Essen) is a retired German judge. He was a justice of the Federal Constitutional Court of Germany and a judge at the Federal Administrative Court of Germany, presiding over the latter between 1991 and 2002.
He studied legal science in Mainz and Münster. He is married and has two children.

References

20th-century German judges
Jurists from North Rhine-Westphalia
Justices of the Federal Constitutional Court
1937 births
Living people
People from Essen
21st-century German judges